Haplochromis paropius is a species of cichlid endemic to Lake Victoria. This species can reach a length of  SL.

References

paropius
Fish described in 1969
Fish of Tanzania
Fish of Lake Victoria
Taxonomy articles created by Polbot